Plethodontohyla mihanika is a species of frog in the family Microhylidae.
It is endemic to Madagascar.
Its natural habitats are subtropical or tropical moist lowland forests, subtropical or tropical moist montane forests, and heavily degraded former forest.

References

Plethodontohyla
Endemic frogs of Madagascar
Taxonomy articles created by Polbot
Amphibians described in 2003